Alfred Herman (September 8, 1889 – December 1973) was an American art director. He was nominated for an Academy Award in the category of Best Art Direction for the film Love Affair.

Selected filmography
 Love Affair (1939)

References

External links

American art directors
Artists from New York City
1889 births
1973 deaths